Wilkins is a surname.

People of note with the surname Wilkins
 Given names A-C:
 Alan Wilkins, Welsh cricketer
 Alan Wilkins, Scottish playwright
 Andy Jones-Wilkins, American ultrarunner
 Ann Wilkins (1806–1857), American missionary teacher
 Arnold Frederic Wilkins (1907–1985), radar pioneer
 Barry Wilkins, Canadian ice hockey player
 Beriah Wilkins (1846–1905), American politician
 Billy Wilkins, American musician and teacher
 Bob Wilkins (1932–2009), American TV personality
 Bobby-Gaye Wilkins, Jamaican Olympic athlete
 Brooke Wilkins, Australian softball player
 Bray Wilkins, founder of Middleton, Massachusetts and figure in the execution of John Willard and  others during the Salem Witch Trials
 Carolyn A. Wilkins, Canadian economist
Carolyn F. Wilkins (born 1945), Australian botanist
 Charles Wilkins (1749–1836), English orientalist
 Charles Wilkins Webber (1819–1856), American journalist and explorer
 Chris Wilkins (1944–2018), South African cricketer
 Christian Wilkins (born 1995), American football player
 Christian Wilkins (born 1995), Australian model
 Clive Wilkins, British artist
 Connie Wilkins, American author
 Given names D-G:
  Damien Wilkins, American basketball player
 Dave Wilkins (1914–1990), Barbadian musician
 David H. Wilkins, American ambassador to Canada
 David Wilkins, Irish Olympic sailor
 David Wilkins (orientalist) (1685–1745), Prussian orientalist
 Dean Wilkins, English football player and manager
 Dominique Wilkins, American basketball player
 Donna Wilkins, New Zealand netball player
 Eddie Lee Wilkins, American basketball player
 Eddie Wilkins, rugby league footballer of the 1960s
 Edwin Wilkins Field (1804–1871), English lawyer and painter
 Eric Wilkins, American baseball player
 Ernie Wilkins (1922–1999), American musician
 Esther Wilkins, American dentist and dental educator
 Francis Wilkins (1864–1908), US-born Canadian politician
 Fraser Wilkins (1908–1989), United States diplomat
 Gabe Wilkins, American football player
 George Wilkins, English dramatist (17th century)
 George Wilkins, English football player and father of footballers Dean, Graham and Ray Wilkins
 Sir George Hubert Wilkins (1888–1958), Australian polar explorer
 Gerald Wilkins, American basketball player in the NBA
Gina Ferris Wilkins, American author
 Glover Wilkins, American Tennessee-Tombigbee Waterway administrator
 Graham Wilkins, English football player
 Given names H-L:
 Harold T. Wilkins (1891–1960), British journalist
 Herve D. Wilkins (1843–1913), American organist and composer
 Hubert Wilkins (1888–1958), Australian polar explorer, ornithologist, geographer and photographer
 Hugh Percy Wilkins (1896–1960), Welsh engineer
 Isaac Wilkins (1743–1830), Jamaican-born Canadian political figure
 J. Ernest Wilkins, Jr.  (1923–2011), American nuclear scientist, engineer and mathematician
 J. Ernest Wilkins, Sr. (1894–1959), American lawyer and labor leader
 J. Steven Wilkins, American author and pastor
 Jack Wilkins, American musician
 Jacques Wilkins, Canadian political figure
 Jeff Wilkins, American football player
 Jeff Wilkins, American basketball player
 Jheanelle Wilkins (born 1988), American politician 
 Joe Willie Wilkins (1921 or 1923–1979), American Memphis blues guitarist, singer and songwriter
 John Wilkins (1614–1672), English Bishop
 John Wilkins, American football coach
 John Wilkins, Moroccan basketball player
 John Wilkins Whitfield (1818–1879), American military general
 Jordan Wilkins, American football player
 Kath Wilkins, English cricketer
 Katie Wilkins, American volleyball player
 Kim Wilkins, Australian author
 Kitty Wilkins (1857–1936), American horse breeder
 Laisha Wilkins, Mexican actress and talk show host
 Len Wilkins (1925–2003), British footballer
 Louis Wilkins (1882–1950), American Olympic athlete
 Given names M:
 Malcolm Maurice "Mac" Wilkins, American athlete
 Manny Wilkins (born 1995), American football player
 Marc Wilkins, American baseball player
 Marc Wilkins, Australian scientist
 Marcus Wilkins, American football player
 Mark Wilkins (racing driver), Canadian racing driver
 Martin Isaac Wilkins (1804–1881), Canadian lawyer and politician
 Mary Eleanor Wilkins Freeman (1852–1930), American author
 Maurice Wilkins (1916–2004), British physicist, molecular biologist, and Nobel Laureate
 Mazzi Wilkins (born 1995), American football player
 Michael J. Wilkins, Utah State Supreme Court Justice
 Morris Wilkins (1925–2015), inventor of the heart-shaped bathtub and champagne glass bathtub
 Given names P-R
 Peter Wilkins, British artist
 Philip Charles Wilkins (1913–1998), U.S. Federal judge
 Ray Wilkins (1956–2018), English football player
 Raymond H. Wilkins (1917–1943), American military officer
 Richard Wilkins (footballer), English footballer
 Richard Wilkins (law), American law professor
 Richard Wilkins (TV presenter), Australian television presenter
 Rick Wilkins, Canadian composer, conductor, and jazz musician
 Rick Wilkins, American baseball player
 Robert Wallace Wilkins (1906–2003), American medical professional
 Robert Wilkins (1896–1987), American musician
 Roger Wilkins (1932–2017), American civil rights leader
 Roger Wilkins (public servant), Australian public servant
 Rosalie Wilkins, Baroness Wilkins, British baroness and politician
 Ross Wilkins (1799–1872), American politician
 Roy Wilkins (1901–1981), American civil rights activist
Roy Wilkins, American football player
 Given names S-W:
 Sharon Wilkins, American actress
 Stephen W. Wilkins (1946–2013), Australian physicist
 Sue Wilkins Myrick, American politician
 Ted Wilkins, rugby league footballer of the 1950s
 Terrence Wilkins, American football player
 Thomas Wilkins (disambiguation)
 Thomas Russell Wilkins (1891–1940), Canadian physicist
  Toby Wilkins,  British movie director
  Vance Wilkins,  American politician
 Vaughan Wilkins, English historical novelist
 Verna Allette Wilkins, author, founder of Tamarind Books
 Wayne Wilkins,  British songwriter/producer
 William A. Wilkins (1899–1987), British politician
 William J. Wilkins (1897–1995), American judge
 William Walter Wilkins, American judge
 William Wilkins (1778–1839), English architect, classical scholar and archaeologist
 William Wilkins (1779–1865), American politician
 Winkie Wilkins, American politician

Fictional
 Curtis Wilkins, comic strip character from Curtis
 Debbie Wilkins, soap opera character from EastEnders
 Major Wilkins, character in Under Capricorn
 Mark Wilkins, character in Resident Evil Outbreak
 Richard Wilkins, fictional character in Buffy the Vampire Slayer
 Wendy Wilkins, soap opera character from Search for Tomorrow
 Wilkins Micawber, character from the novel David Copperfield
 Wilkins, villain in the comic Batman #50
 Wilkins,  Muppet created by Jim Henson

See also
Wilkin (surname)

References

English-language surnames
Patronymic surnames
Surnames from given names